Leonardo Díaz Aldana (born 16 February 1975) is a Paralympian athlete from Cuba competing mainly in category F56 throwing events.

Leonardo has competed in the shot, discus and javelin in three consecutive Paralympics. In his first in Athens in 2004 he failed to finish in the medal positions. On returning four years later to Beijing he won the gold medal in the F55/56 category discus, a feat he replicated in London in 2012.

Notes

References

External links
 

1975 births
Living people
Paralympic athletes of Cuba
Athletes (track and field) at the 2004 Summer Paralympics
Athletes (track and field) at the 2008 Summer Paralympics
Athletes (track and field) at the 2012 Summer Paralympics
Athletes (track and field) at the 2020 Summer Paralympics
Paralympic gold medalists for Cuba
Paralympic bronze medalists for Cuba
World record holders in Paralympic athletics
Cuban male discus throwers
Cuban male javelin throwers
Cuban male shot putters
Medalists at the 2008 Summer Paralympics
Medalists at the 2012 Summer Paralympics
Medalists at the 2020 Summer Paralympics
Paralympic medalists in athletics (track and field)
World Para Athletics Championships winners
Medalists at the 2007 Parapan American Games
Medalists at the 2011 Parapan American Games
Medalists at the 2015 Parapan American Games
People from Bayamo
21st-century Cuban people